Thomas Mansfield is a firm of solicitors specialising in Employment Law in London and the South East of England. The firm was founded in January 2004 by Neill Thomas and Jonathan Mansfield. Both experienced employment lawyers, they decided to establish the niche firm having previously worked together at a law firm in Orpington.

In the early days of the practice Thomas Mansfield worked with smaller commercial clients and gradually began to expand and work with SME's and city executives. As the practice became more popular, Thomas Mansfield expanded its operation by opening an office in London and employing more solicitors. The solicitors it employed were always chosen from either London City or large regional firms within the South East.

Employment Law Training

In late 2004 Neill Thomas and Jonathan Mansfield were given the idea of creating employment law training videos that could be watched by new staff as part of their induction. These were primarily aimed at large employers and initially two films were made with titles of ‘How to Conduct a Disciplinary Hearing’ and ‘How to Understand the Information and Consultation Regulations?’. 
‘How to conduct a disciplinary hearing’ reviews the effect of the Employment Act 2002 on employment tribunals and the ACAS code of practise for formal disciplinary investigations and hearings. The aim of the programme was to set out guidelines for the conduct of disciplinary hearings and provides an illustration into the investigation of less serious misconduct. The programme encourages managers to be aware of both the Employment Right Act 1996  and 2008  and its replacement of Statutory Dispute Resolution Procedures.

‘How to understand the Information and Consultation regulations’ was targeted towards an audience of senior managers who need to be aware of regulations and the managers who will act as representative for the company. The programme featured a dramatization of an employer putting in place consultations arrangements to inform and consult the workforce through representatives and includes interviews with industry experts and a walk through guide for negotiated arrangements. 
Thomas Mansfield have begun work on a third title ‘How to prevent and defend claims of harassment’ which was scheduled to be complete in 2014. The programme aims to make sure employees are aware of their obligation not to commit discriminatory harassment and will include new legislation under ‘The European Recommendation and Code of Practise of the Dignity of Women and Men at Work’.

In addition to the published films, Neill and Jonathan also produced a complementary set of training materials with Guides and self-assessment question sheets to reinforce the learning. Thomas Mansfield exhibited the two new titles at the CIPD annual exhibition in Harrogate in 2004 and won best small stand competition for the enthusiasm and quality of advice given out about the training products. CIPD also published an editorial of the video believing  it adequately covers ‘examples of workplace harassment relating to sexual orientation and religious belief, which will be of use to many employers’. The films gained much attention and were purchased by many household names such as Rolls-Royce, Del Monte, the Northern Ireland Police Force and even ACAS purchased the films to use as part of their own training programmes.

Following this, the firm were commissioned by the Department for International Development to produce a bespoke interactive employment law training package for its senior managers to use a resource wherever they are located in the world.

Law Society

In 2009 Thomas Mansfield won the Law Society's prestigious prize for Excellence in Innovation after developing a comprehensive employment law advice package aimed at SME's, which incorporates an insurance product to pay the legal costs for defending a case and which pays compensation awarded (to a specified limit) should the case be lost. The firm also gained rankings in both the Legal 500. and Chambers Guide to the Legal profession 

Company Expansion

In 2007 Thomas Mansfield expanded further by opening an office in Manchester and this was followed in 2008 by an office in Birmingham. The company aims to build on its health and safety client list which includes: ACAS; The Police Service of Northern Ireland; The London Fire Brigade; Aga - Rayburn; Del Monte Fresh Produce (UK) Ltd; The Edinburgh Woollen Mill Ltd, & Trailfinders.

References

Law firms based in London